Spacediver or space diver or similar, may refer to:

 A space diver, a person who participates in space diving
 Intamin Space Diver, a rollercoaster design
 The Space Diver (coaster), a roller coaster at Six Flags Magic Mountain, Valencia, California, USA
 Space Diver (album), a 2020 album by Boris Brejcha

See also

 
 
 Space (disambiguation)
 Diver (disambiguation)
 Skydiver (disambiguation)